Aulacophora arcuata is a species of leaf beetles in the genus Aulacophora.

References

Beetles described in 1888
Aulacophora